The Lagoa de Óbidos is a lagoon that extends between the municipalities of Óbidos and Caldas da Rainha, in the Oeste region of Portugal.

It is situated in a shallow depression, defined by unstable irregular contours close to the sea; it is a natural barrier that separate the Atlantic Ocean and marine biome from the river ecosystem of Foz do Arelho formed by lateral dunes. Its connection to the sea is made across an intermittent channel, whose transitional zone requires timely interventions to maintain its access.

External links
 Lagoa de Óbidos at Portal Caldas da Rainha

Óbidos, Portugal
Obidos
Geography of Leiria District
Centro Region